This is a list of electoral results for the Melbourne West Province in Victorian state elections.

Members for Melbourne West Province

Election results

Elections in the 2000s

Elections in the 1990s

Elections in the 1980s

 Two party preferred vote was estimated.

Elections in the 1970s

 Preferences were not distributed.

 Two party preferred vote was estimated.

 This by-election was caused by the disqualification of Bunna Walsh.

 Two party preferred vote was estimated.

Elections in the 1960s

 Two party preferred was estimated.

Two party preferred vote was estimated.

Elections in the 1950s

 Bert Bailey was elected in 1952 as a member of Labor, then defected to the DLP in 1955.

References

Victoria (Australia) state electoral results by district